The World Team of the 20th Century was chosen in 1998 to comprise the best association football players of the 20th century CE. The team comprises an eleven-member side, with one goalkeeper, four defenders, three midfielders, and three forwards.

History
The team was announced on 10 June 1998, in conjunction with the opening ceremonies of the 1998 FIFA World Cup in France. The team was selected in plurality voting undertaken by a panel of 250 international football journalists from amongst the members of eleven-member sides styled as the South American and European Teams of the 20th Century, selected previously by the same panel to be composed of players respectively to have represented principally member nations of the CONMEBOL and UEFA continental confederations.

Similarly constituted teams for players from the nations of CONCACAF, the Confederation of African Football, and collectively the Asian and Oceania Football Confederations were chosen by separate, smaller juries of journalists situated respectively in North and Central America, Africa, and Asia and Oceania, and announced alongside the European and South American teams, but players selected to the former sides were not considered for selection to the world team.

Players

Notes

See also
FIFA World Cup All-Time Team
FIFA World Cup Dream Team
FIFA 100
FIFA Player of the Century
World Soccer's Greatest Players of the 20th Century

References
Brown, Gerry, and Morrison, Michael (eds.; 2003).  ESPN Information Please Sports Almanac. New York City: ESPN Books and Hyperion (joint). .

External links
Analysis of the constitution of the world team in the International Herald Tribune
Enumeration of the European, South American, and world teams by Infoplease
Ramos, Balboa named to MasterCard CONCACAF 20th Century team. SoccerTimes

Association football trophies and awards
+World
Lists of association football players